Beyt-e Savadi (also Romanized as Beyt-e Savādī; also known as Bait as Suwadi, Beyt-e Savādīpūr, and Qaryeh-ye Sa'vādī) is a village in Moshrageh Rural District, Moshrageh District, Ramshir County, Khuzestan Province, Iran. At the 2006 census, its population was 145, in 30 families.

References 

Populated places in Ramshir County